"Eye of the Tiger" is a 1982 song by Survivor.  

Eye of the Tiger may also refer to any of the following:
 Eye of the Tiger (album), the 1982 album by Survivor from which the song was taken
 Eye of the Tiger (film), a 1986 action/drama film
 Sinbad and the Eye of the Tiger, a 1977 fantasy film
 The Eye of the Tiger (novel), a 1975 novel by Wilbur Smith
 The Eyes of the Tiger, a 1965 novel in the Nick Carter-Killmaster spy series
 The Eye of the Tyger, a 2003 novel by Paul J. McAuley
  The Eye of the Tiger, a 61.5-carat brown diamond, part of the jewellery collection of the Indian state of Nawanagar

See also
 Tiger's eye, a gemstone
 The Tiger's Eye: A Jungle Fairy Tale, a short story by L. Frank Baum published in 1962
 "Roar" (song), a 2013 Katy Perry song featuring the lyric "eye of the tiger"